Gobio kizilirmakensis is a species of gudgeon, a small freshwater in the family Cyprinidae. It is found in the Kızılırmak River basin in Turkey.

Description 
Gobio kizilirmakensis distinguishes itself from others of its genus and region by bearing several distinct features: small scales on its belly; head length of around 27% SL; rounded snout; notably large mouth gape; preanal length of around 70% SL; prepelvic length of around 50% SL; caudal peduncle length about 2.5 times its depth; and 8-9 midlateral black blotches, among other features.

It is a benthopelagic species, which thrives in freshwater, subtropical climates. It is most commonly found in Asia; native particularly to the Anatolia region.

References

 

Gobio
Taxa named by Davut Turan
Taxa named by Bella Japoshvili
Taxa named by İsmail Aksu
Taxa named by Yusuf Bektaş
Fish described in 2016
Fish of Turkey